William Howard Taft (1857–1930) was the president of the United States from 1909 to 1913.

William Taft may also refer to:
William Howard Taft II (1887-1952), son of Henry Waters Taft and nephew of President William Howard Taft 
William Howard Taft III (1915–1991), Son of Robert A Taft U.S. Ambassador to Ireland
William Howard Taft IV (born 1945), U.S. Deputy Secretary of Defense
William W. Taft (born 1932), American politician, former member of the Ohio Senate
Bill Taft (born 1965), American rock musician

See also
William Howard Taft High School (disambiguation)